Jean Borotra defeated René Lacoste 6–1, 3–6, 6–1, 3–6, 6–4 in the final to win the gentlemen's singles tennis title at the 1924 Wimbledon Championships. Bill Johnston was the defending champion, but did not participate.

Draw

Finals

Top half

Section 1

Section 2

Section 3

Section 4

Bottom half

Section 5

Section 6

Section 7

Section 8

References

External links

Men's Singles
Wimbledon Championship by year – Men's singles